The Copa del Generalísimo 1944 Final was the 42nd final of the King's Cup. The final was played at Montjuïc in Barcelona, on 25 June 1944, being won by Club Atlético de Bilbao, who beat Valencia CF 2-0.

Details

References

1944
Copa
Athletic Bilbao matches
Valencia CF matches